Tibor Badari (17 August 1948 – 2014) was a Hungarian boxer. He competed at the 1968 Summer Olympics and the 1976 Summer Olympics. At the 1976 Summer Olympics, he defeated Gizaw Asefa of Ethiopia, via a walkover, before losing to Davey Armstrong of the United States.

References

External links
 

1948 births
2014 deaths
Hungarian male boxers
Olympic boxers of Hungary
Boxers at the 1968 Summer Olympics
Boxers at the 1976 Summer Olympics
People from Mátészalka
Bantamweight boxers
Sportspeople from Szabolcs-Szatmár-Bereg County